Keratosis extremitatum progrediens may refer to:
 Diffuse nonepidermolytic palmoplantar keratoderma
 Erythrokeratodermia variabilis

Palmoplantar keratodermas